Hugh Jardine Good (2 July 1901 – 1958) was a Scottish footballer who played in the Football League for Exeter City, Middlesbrough and Torquay United.

References

1901 births
1979 deaths
Scottish footballers
Association football defenders
English Football League players
Wishaw F.C. players
Kilmarnock F.C. players
Middlesbrough F.C. players
Exeter City F.C. players
Bristol City F.C. players
Torquay United F.C. players
Raith Rovers F.C. players
Bo'ness United F.C. players
Lovell's Athletic F.C. players
Glentoran F.C. players
Larne F.C. players
Montrose F.C. players